Paul Scott (born 5 November 1979, in Wakefield) is an English professional footballer who now plays for Wakefield City FC.

Playing career

Huddersfield Town
Beginning his career as a trainee at Huddersfield Town, Scott made just 32 league appearances for the club before leaving aged 24. His début came in Huddersfield's 1–0 win at Peterborough United on 17 August 2002.

Scott left Huddersfield in 2004 to join Bury after making 32 appearances scoring two goals between 1997 and 2004.

Bury
Moving to Bury on a free transfer, Scott started at Bury on non-contract terms, debuting for the club on 22 August 2004 in the 1–1 draw against Chester City. Scott established himself as a regular in Bury's starting side towards the end of the 2004–05, after signing a permanent contract.

Originally a centre-back, Scott can also play in midfield, but is most familiar with the right back position during his time at Bury.

Morecambe
Scott signed a two-year contract with Morecambe in June 2010. Unfortunately, Scott spent much of his time with The Shrimps suffering from long term injury problems. As a result, his contract was mutually terminated early in April 2012.

Personal
In 2010, Scott was studying part-time for a bachelor's degree in Sports Performance at the University of Salford.

References

External links

Official club profile

1979 births
Living people
Footballers from Wakefield
English footballers
Association football fullbacks
English Football League players
Huddersfield Town A.F.C. players
Bury F.C. players
Morecambe F.C. players
Alumni of the University of Salford